Świebodzice is a town in south-western Poland with 22,793 inhabitants. It is situated in Świdnica County, Lower Silesian Voivodeship (from 1975–1998 it was in the former Wałbrzych Voivodeship).

The town is situated close to Książ Castle, which during World War II, together with the cave complex, was expanded to create private quarters for Adolf Hitler.

The town dates back to the medieval Kingdom of Poland. It was granted town rights by 1279. During World War II, the Germans established a subcamp of the Gross-Rosen concentration camp in the town. In 1957 Pełcznica, and in 1973 Ciernie, were included within the town limits as its new districts.

Sports
 football club is based in Świebodzice.

Notable people
Gustav Becker (1819–1885), German clockmaker
Martin Kirschner (1842–1912), Mayor of Berlin
Jan Mikulicz-Radecki (1850–1905), Polish surgeon, one of the pioneers of antiseptics and aseptic techniques
Alfred Zucker (1852–1913), German architect
Wilhelm Niepelt (1862–1936), German scientist
Emil Krebs (1867–1930), German scientist, noted polyglot who spoke a total of 68 languages at the time of his death
Hartmut Kilger (born 1943), President of the German Lawyer's Association (2003–2009)
Anna Zalewska (born 1965), politician, Minister of National Education of Poland
Krzysztof Stelmach (born 1967), former Polish volleyball player with 274 games played for the Poland men's national volleyball team
Jarosław Krzyżanowski (born 1975), retired Polish footballer
Eliza Surdyka (born 1977), Polish Olympic cross-country skier
Marcin Kokoszka (born 1984), Polish footballer
Paweł Fajdek (born 1989), Polish hammer-thrower

Twin towns – sister cities

Świebodzice is twinned with:
 Hrušov, Slovakia
 Jilemnice, Czech Republic
 Marjina Horka, Belarus
 Waldbröl, Germany

Gallery

References

External links

 Jewish Community in Świebodzice on Virtual Shtetl

Cities and towns in Lower Silesian Voivodeship
Świdnica County